WNEX-FM is an FM radio station serving the middle Georgia area with an Americana format. Licensed to Perry, Georgia, United States, the station serves the Macon, Georgia area, broadcasting on 100.9 MHz and is owned by Creek Media.

References

External links

NEX-FM
Americana radio stations
Radio stations established in 1966
1966 establishments in Georgia (U.S. state)